Coral is a census-designated place located in Center Township, Indiana County, Pennsylvania, United States. The community is located between the borough of Homer City and the community of Black Lick on U.S. Route 119. It is bordered to the north by Graceton. As of the 2010 census the population of Coral was 325.

Demographics

References

External links

Census-designated places in Indiana County, Pennsylvania
Census-designated places in Pennsylvania